Harvey Sweetland Lewis (born April 1976) is an American ultrarunner.

Lewis represented Team USA at the International Association of Ultrarunners (IAU) 24 Hour World Championship in 2012, 2013, 2014, and 2017. Lewis's qualifying run for the 2017 championship was 157.9 miles on September 19, 2015, when he won the NorthCoast 24-Hour Endurance Run in Cleveland, OH.

Lewis has competed in well known events such as the Badwater Ultramarathon, Arrowhead Region Ultra and the Marathon des Sables, as well as lesser known endurance events such as the Ultra Gobi, where part of the challenge for the 50 participants is in self-navigating and self-supporting the 400 km course (250 miles) through the Gobi Desert in western China, with temperatures ranging from below freezing to 100 °F.

In July 2014, Lewis won the Badwater Ultramarathon near Death Valley, CA, in just under 23 hours and 53 minutes. This race is touted as the world's toughest foot race due to extremely hot temperatures and immense elevation changes throughout the course. Six months later near the Canada–US border in International Falls, MN, Lewis tied for second place at the Arrowhead 135.

The 135-mile Badwater Ultramarathon is touted as the World's Toughest Race, a non-stop race beginning at Badwater, Death Valley, and ending at the Mt. Whitney Portal. The race features non-stop running through extreme elevation climbs (17,000’ cumulative vertical ascent), 100 °F temperatures during the day, cooler temperatures at night, and what many would consider adverse overall conditions. Lewis completed the race in under 24 hours (23:52:55), about 50 minutes ahead of the second-place finisher, Australian Grant Maughan, with an average 10:30 pace.

Runners must qualify and apply to compete at Badwater, and only 100 runners are invited each year. In 2014, the field included runners from 25 different countries, including the 2013 winner from Portugal, Carlos Sá. Badwater is cited by National Geographic Adventure as Number 1 for the Top Ten Toughest Races. In the same National Geographic Adventure listing, Arrowhead (referenced above) comes in at Number 7.

Lewis has a legacy with the Long Haul 100 Mile trail race in Land-o-Lakes, Florida having won the event on two occasions. He won the 2022 Long Haul 100 Mile with a time of 16:07.24. He also won the 2020 Long Haul 100 with a time of 15:55:19, that year he won by over two hours. He placed second in 2021 with a time of 14:49:07, behind Keith Lundquist. In 2019, he placed third overall with a time of 18:19:29.

Gandhi’s Salt March 

In 2008, Lewis earned a grant to retrace the steps of Mahatma Gandhi’s famous 1930 Salt March: a nonviolent protest to the  salt tax, which had provided a British monopoly resulting in extreme pricing of salt to colonial Indians, who were prohibited to manufacture salt on their own. Gandhi, who started with 80 followers called satyagrahis, or “truth-force,” walked 241 miles from his home (the Harijan Ashram) to the coastal city of Dandi, where Gandhi picked up some grains of salt, thereby sparking the  civil disobedience movement  which eventually led to India's independence.

Selma to Montgomery 

In 2009, Lewis retraced Dr. Martin Luther King Jr.'s historic Selma to Montgomery march. Lewis also met with the 99-year-old Amelia Boynton Robinson after his run. Robinson (then known as Boynton) was a nonviolent protester who helped organize the 1965 march, and was one of several marchers beaten unconscious by state troopers and county officers at the Edmund Pettus Bridge six blocks from its start. "I believe God kept me alive 99 years so I can share my story with young people," Robinson told Lewis.

Early life 
Lewis was born in Wheeling, West Virginia and spent much of his childhood in Berea, Ohio.

Accomplishments

Winner 
Winner, Long Haul 100 (100 Miles) January 2022 

Winner, Big Dog's Backyard Ultra (354.16 miles) October 2021

Winner, Badwater Ultramarathon (135 miles) 25:50:23 July 2021

Winner, Long Haul 100 (100 Miles) January 2020 

Winner, Badwater Ultramarathon (135 miles) 23:52:55 July 2014

Winner, SC24, Spartanburg, SC, March 16, 2014: 154.590 miles

Winner, Stone Steps 50K, Cincinnati, OH, Oct. 27, 2013: 4:15:33

Winner, NorthCoast 24-Hour Endurance Run, Cleveland, OH, Sept. 21, 2013: 150.58678 miles

Winner, FANS 24-Hours, Minnesota, June 2, 2012: 142.86 miles

Winner, Tie Dye 32M, Apr 28, 2012: 4:01:32 

Winner, Sulphur Springs 160 km, May 29, 2010: 17:12:37

Course records 
Sulphur Springs 100 (Ontario, Canada) on the "old course" at 17:12:37, in 2010.

References 

Living people
American male marathon runners
1976 births
People from Berea, Ohio